|}

This is a list of House of Assembly results for the 1979 Tasmanian election.

Results by division

Bass

Braddon

Denison

Franklin

Wilmot

See also 

 1979 Tasmanian state election
 Members of the Tasmanian House of Assembly, 1979–1982
 Candidates of the 1979 Tasmanian state election

References 

Results of Tasmanian elections